The Silliman Memorial lectures series has been published by Yale University since 1901. The lectures were established by the university on the foundation of a bequest of $80,000, left in 1883 by Augustus Ely Silliman, in memory of his mother, Mrs. Hepsa Ely Silliman.  Hepsa Ely was the daughter of the Reverend David Ely, a member of the Yale College Class of 1769. She was married to Gold Selleck Silliman, brother of Professor Benjamin Silliman and a 1796 graduate of Yale College. She was the mother of two sons, August Ely Silliman and Benjamin Douglas Silliman. Benjamin graduated from Yale College in 1824.

The lectures are designed to illustrate the presence and providence, the wisdom and goodness of God, as manifested in the natural and moral world. The testator's belief was that any orderly presentation of the facts of nature or history contributed to the foundation's purpose more effectively than any attempt to emphasize the elements of doctrine or creed; and he therefore provided that lectures on dogmatic or polemical theology should be excluded from its scope, and that instead the subjects should be selected from the domains of natural science and history, with  special prominence given to astronomy, chemistry, geology, and anatomy.

Lecturers  (partial list)

 1902-03 Thomson, Joseph John - Electricity and Matter (1904)
 1903-04 Sherrington, Charles Scott - The Integrative Action of the Nervous System (1906)
 1904-05 Rutherford, Ernest - Radioactive Transformations (1906)
 1905-06 No Lecture
 1906-07 Nernst, Walter - Experimental and Theoretical Applications of Thermodynamics to Chemistry (1911, republished 1913)
 1907-08 Bateson, William - Problems of Genetics (1913)
 1908-09 Penck, Albrecht
 1909-10 Campbell, William Wallace - Stellar Motions (1913)
 1910-11 Arrhenius, Svante August - Theories of Solutions (1912)
 1911-12 Verworn, Max - Irritability (1908)
 1912-13 Osler, William - The Evolution of Modern Medicine (1921)
 1913-14 Iddings, Joseph Paxson et al. - The Problem of Volcanism (1914)
 1913-14 Lindgren, Waldemar et al. - Problems of American Geology (1915)
 1915-16 No Lecture
 1916-17 Haldane, John Scott - Organism and Environment as Illustrated by the Physiology of Breathing Respiration (1917)
 1917-18 Dana, Barrell et al. - A Century of Science in America (Dana Commemorative Lectures) (1922)
 1918-19 No Lecture
 1919-20 Hadamard, Jacques Solomon - Lecture on Cauchy's Problem in Linear Partial Differential Equations (1923)
 1920-21 Cumont, Franz - After Life in Roman Paganism (1922)
 1920-21 Rettger, Leo Frederick - A Treatise on the Transformation of the Intestinal Flora with Special Reference to the Implantation of Bacillus Acidophillus (1921)
 1921-22 Pirquet, Clemens - An Outline of the Pirquet System of Nutrition (1922)
 1922-23 Krogh, August - The Anatomy and Physiology of Capillaries (1922, rev. ed. 1927)
 1923-24 Bohr, Niels 
 1924-25 Morgan, Thomas Hunt - The Theory of the Gene (1926)
 1925-26 Lewis, Gilbert Newton - The Anatomy of Science (1926)
 1926-27 Andrews, Ernest Clayton 
 1927-28 Henderson, Lawrence Joseph - Blood: A Study in General Physiology (1928)
 1928-30 No Lecture
 1930-31 Wieland, Heinrich Otto - On the Mechanism of Oxidation (1932)
 1931-32 Richardson, Owen Willans - Molecular Hydrogen and its Spectrum (1934)
 1932-33 No Lecture
 1933-34 Daly, Reginald Aldworth - The Changing World of the Ice Age (1934)
 1934-35 Spemann, Hans - Induction (1938)
 1935-36 Hubble, Edwin Powell - The Realm of the Nebulae (1936, repub. 1982)
 1936-37 Watson, David M. Seares - Paleontology and Modern Biology (1951)
 1937-38 No Lecture
 1938-39 Chibnall, Albert Charles - Protein Metabolism in the Plant (1939)
 1939-40 Goldschmidt, Richard B. - The Material Basis of Evolution (1940, repub. 1982)
 1940-45 No Lecture
 1945-46 Lawrence, Ernest; Pauling, Linus; Beadle, George; Stanley, Wendell - The Centennial of the Sheffield Scientific School (George Alfred Baitsell ed.) (1950)
 1946-47 Cohn, Edwin Joseph 
 1947-48 Beadle, George Wells 
 1948-49 Harrison, Ross Granville - Organization and Development of the Embryo (1969, edited by Sally Widens)
 1949-50 Fermi, Enrico - Elementary Particles (1951, paper 1961)
 1950-51 Urey, Harold Clayton - The Planets: Their Origin and Development (1952, paper 1961)
 1951-52 Pettersson, Hans - The Ocean Floor (1954)
 1952-53 Cori, Carl Ferdinand; Dunning, John Ray; Suits, Chauncey Guy
 1953-54 Granit, Ragner - Receptors and Sensory Perception (1955)
 1954-55 Spence, Kenneth Wartenbe -  Behavior Theory and Conditioning (1956)
 1955-56 von Neumann, John - The Computer and the Brain (1958, paper 1979)
 1956-57 Seaborg, Glenn Theodore  The Transuranium Elements (1958)
 1957-58 No Lecture
 1958-59 Dobzhansky, Theodosius - Mankind Evolving (1962)
 1959-60 Rubey, William Walden
 1960-61 Dubos, Rene Jules - Man Adapting (1965, paper 1967, enlarged ed. c & p 1990)
 1961-62 No Lecture
 1962-63 Chandrasekhar, Subrahmanyan - Ellipsoidal Figures of Equilibrium (1969)
 1963-64 Leakey, Louis S.B.; Todd, Sir Alexander
 1964-65 Mulliken, Robert Sanderson 
 1965-66 Rushton, William Albert Hugh
 1966-67 Wilkinson, Denys Haigh 
 1966-67 Lectures on the Centennial of the Peabody Museum - Evolution and Environment (Ellen Drake, ed) (1968)
 1967-68 Bronowski, Jacob - On the Origins of Knowledge and Imagination (1979)
 1968-69 Lederberg, Joshua 
 1969-70 Bishop, et al. The Late Cenozoic Glacial Ages (1971, ed. K.K. Turekian)
 1970-74 No Lecture
 1974-75 Kuffler, Stephen 
 1975-76 Jacob, François
 1976-77 Cox, Allen
 1977-78 Weinberg, Steven
 1977-78 Spitzer, Lyman - Searching Between the Stars (1982)
 1978-79 Kornberg, Arthur
 1979-80 McLaren, Anne - Germ Cells and Soma: A New Look at an Old Problem (1981)
 1980-81 Hoffmann, Roald; Gajdusek, D. Carleton
 1981-82 Wetherill, George
 1982-83 Pilbeam, David 
 1983-84 Thorne, Kip - Black Holes: The Membrane Paradigm (with Richard Price and Douglas Macdonald) (1986)
 1984-85 Klug, Aaron
 1985-86 Corey, E.J. 
 1986-87 Kandel, Eric R. 
 1987-89 No Lecture
 1989-90 Nüsslein-Volhard, Christiane 
 1989-90 Gel'fand, Israïl Moyseyovich 
 1990-92 No Lecture
 1992-93 Bromley, David Allan
 1993-94 No Lecture
 1994-95 Peebles, Philip J. E. - Cosmogony: How did Galaxies Form?; Mass Puzzles and the Past and Future of Our Expanding Universe 
 1995-96 Hopfield, John J. - Neural Networks: Brains and Computers 
 1996-97 Shoemaker, Eugene - Near-Earth Asteroids and Comets"
 1997-98 No Lecture
 1998-99 Pierre-Gilles de Gennes - From Rice to Snow: Problems of Granular Matter
 1998-99 Karplus, Martin  - Proteins: The Fourth Dimension 
 1999-01 No Lecture
 2001-02 Leakey, Meave - African Origins -Sole Survivors of a Diverse Past 
 2001-02 Allman, John - Evolving Brains 
 2001-02 Cavalli-Storza, Luigi - Genes, Peoples and Languages 
 2001-02 Cech, Thomas - The RNA World and the Origins of Life - Life Before Yale (Long Before)
 2001-02 Schopf, J. William - Discovery of Earth's Earliest Fossils - Solutions to Darwin's Dilemma     
 2001-02 Wasserburg, G.J. - From Small Rocks to Big Stars and the Early Universe - a Study of Cosmochemical Immodesty      
 2002-03 Anderson, James G. - Chemistry and the Earth: Bridging Electronic Structure and Climate ; The Nature of the Chemical Bond in Transition: Prediction of Barrier Heights ; Coupling of Chemistry and Climate: Eocene, Present and Future 
 2003-12 No Lecture    
 2012-13 Faber, Sandra - Genesis: The Modern Story   
 2013-14 Banaji, Mahzarin - Group Love 
 2014-15 McKenzie, Dan - Plates and Earthquakes: Why We Expect a Million Deaths this Century
2016-17 Alley, Richard B - Sea-Level Rise: Inconvenient, or Unmanageable?
2017-18 Richards-Kortum, Rebecca - Essential Solutions and Technologies to Eliminate Preventable Newborn Death in Africa 
2018-19 Reich, David - Who We Are and How We Got Here; Ancient DNA and the New Science of the Human Past
2019-20 No Lecture

The year given is sometimes that of the publication of the book, rather than that in which the lectures were given.

Notes

External links

 https://yalebooks.yale.edu/series/the-silliman-memorial-lectures-series
 https://www.science.org/doi/10.1126/science.82.2124.246.a

Yale University
Lecture series